James L. Oblinger is an American academic administrator who was the 13th Chancellor of North Carolina State University. He served in this position from 2005, after the resignation of Chancellor Marye Anne Fox, until his resignation on June 8, 2009, amid increased public and media scrutiny surrounding the hiring and compensation of Mary P. Easley, wife of former Governor Mike Easley and the severance package provided for former provost Larry Nielsen.

Early life
Oblinger was born in 1945 in Ashland, Ohio. He earned a Bachelor's in bacteriology from DePauw University, and a Master's and Ph.D. from Iowa State University in Food Technology.

Career

During the early years of  Oblinger's career, he served at the University of Missouri as Associate Dean & Director of Resident Instruction, College of Agriculture and at the University of Florida as Professor of Food Science and Human Nutrition.

He received the Institute of Food Technologists' William V. Cruess Award in 1983.

North Carolina State University

The position Oblinger first held at N.C. State was as the Associate Dean of Academic Programs in the College of Agriculture and Life Sciences. He later became Dean. He is also a professor in the Department of Food Science (College of Agriculture and Life Sciences). Other positions at NC State include:

Provost & Executive Vice-Chancellor for Academic Affairs
Dean, College of Agriculture and Life Sciences
Associate Dean & Director of Academic Programs, College of Agriculture and Life Sciences.

In 2005, following the resignation of Chancellor Marye Anne Fox, the NC State Board of Trustees announced Oblinger as the thirteenth chancellor of NC State. Oblinger resigned from the chancellorship in June 2009.

Personal life
Oblinger is married to Diana G. Oblinger. They have four sons, who have all attended NC State.

Sources

Office of the Chancellor, Biography 

1945 births
DePauw University alumni
Iowa State University alumni
University of Missouri faculty
University of Florida faculty
Chancellors of North Carolina State University
Living people